In color theory, a tint is the mixture of a color with white. Tint or TINT may also refer to:
 Tint (magazine), a women's magazine from Detroit, Michigan
 T.I.N.T. (mixtape), a mixtape by Efya
 Thailand Institute of Nuclear Technology
 Tint (name)
 "Tints" (song), 2018 single by Anderson .Paak

See also
 Brick tinting, the process of physically changing the color of bricks
 Film tinting, the process of adding color to black-and-white film
 Tint control, an adjustment to correct for phase error in the picture color on a NTSC television set
 Tinted windows or window film, a treatment to achieve a variety of tinting effects in windows